"Nothing Else" is a song by American Christian musician Cody Carnes. The song was released on January 4, 2019, as the lead single from his second studio album, Run to the Father (2020). Carnes co-wrote the song with Hank Bentley and Jessie Early. Carnes collaborated with Austin Davis and McKendree Tucker in producing the single.

"Nothing Else" peaked at No. 31 on the US Hot Christian Songs chart.

Background
"Nothing Else" was Cody Carnes' first single of 2019, following the release of "Cover the Earth" alongside Kari Jobe in 2018. Carnes shared the story behind the song with FreeCCM.

Composition

Commercial performance
"Nothing Else" debuted at No. 35 on the US Hot Christian Songs chart dated January 19, 2019, concurrently charting at No. 17 on the Christian Digital Song Sales chart.

Music videos
The lyric video of "Nothing Else" was published on January 2, 2019, on Cody Carnes' YouTube channel. The live music video of the song, performed by Cody Carnes, recorded at Passion 2019, was published on February 6, 2019, on Cody Carnes' YouTube channel.

Track listing

Charts

Weekly charts

Year-end charts

Release history

References

External links
 
  on PraiseCharts

2019 singles
2019 songs
Cody Carnes songs
Songs written by Cody Carnes